The Pitcairn Islands is a non-sovereign British overseas territory and the New Zealand dollar is used as exchange. The Pitcairn Islands began issuing its first commemorative coins in 1988. Though the Pitcairn Islands dollar is not a true currency in the strict sense of the word, and is not used as a circulation coinage, it can be lawfully exchanged as tender. The Pitcairn Islands dollar exists only because of the coin collecting market, which provides a major staple for the island nation. Having a population of only 50 according to the 2020 census, and with only one island in the group of four being populated, there is no need for local coinage. Coins consist of an important part of the Pitcairn Islands' tiny economy and help raise funds for the government's largely fixed and subsidised income.

Coins

New Zealand coins and notes are circulated in the Pitcairn Islands. However, the Pitcairn Islands began issuing its first denominational coin set in 2009. They were in six denominations of copper-plated bronze 5, and 10 Cents, nickel-plated bronze 20, and 50 Cents, and bronze , and  pieces. They come in Uncirculated and Proof conditions and could be acquired in packaged sets or in rolls. The reverse of each coin depicts a relic from H.M.A.V. Bounty along with its description and the coin's respective denomination. This is surrounded by a fine border.

The coins are of similar size, weight, and colouration to those of a similar set from Niue. The Pitcairn Islands set also has the addition of a 5 Cents piece which New Zealand no longer uses.

A majority of Pitcairn Islands coins are minted in New Zealand. But many bullion commemoratives have also been made by the Royal Mint in the United Kingdom and other private mints under the order of the Pitcairn Islands Government.

The coin reverses depict as follows:
5 CENTS: Bounty Anchor
10 CENTS: Bounty Ship Bell
20 CENTS: Bounty Bible
50 CENTS: Pitcairn Longboat
1 DOLLAR: Bounty Cannon
2 DOLLARS: H.M.A.V. Bountys Helm

Elizabeth II is depicted on all coins of the Pitcairn Islands as Head of State and Queen of the United Kingdom of Great Britain and Northern Ireland, of which the Pitcairn Islands are a territory.

Although the coins are not circulating on the island, the coin sets may be purchased at the Pitcairn Island General Post Office in the capital of Adamstown.

In 2021 the island started issuing "fifty pence" coins, including a set commemorating Beano comic characters.

See also

 New Zealand Dollar
 Adamstown
 Pitcairn Islands
 Oeno Island
 Mutiny on the Bounty
 Cook Islands dollar
 Postage stamps and postal history of the Pitcairn Islands
 Niue dollar

References

 
 Krause, Chester L. and Clifford Mishler (1991). Standard Catalog of World Coins: 1801–1991 (18th ed. ed.). Krause Publications. .
 

Currencies of the Commonwealth of Nations
Currencies of Oceania
Pitcairn Islands
Currencies introduced in 1988